Jellinek is a Germanized variant of the Czech name Jelínek meaning "little deer" (diminutive of jelen). When used as a kinnui, it refers to the Biblical allusion to Naphtali. Notable people with the surname include:

 Adolf Jellinek (1821–1893), an Austrian rabbi and scholar.
 Emil Jellinek (1853–1918), an automobile entrepreneur, son of Adolf
 Max Hermann Jellinek (1868–1938), son of Adolf Jellinek
 Georg Jellinek (1851–1911), jurist, son of Adolf Jellinek
 E. Morton Jellinek (1890–1963) a psychologist and researcher into alcoholism

 George Jellinek (1919–2010), broadcaster, expert in classical music, especially vocal

References 

Czech-language surnames
Jewish surnames